Uroleucon cirsii, the large thistle aphid, is a species of aphid in the family Aphididae.

References

Further reading

External links

 

Insects described in 1758
Taxa named by Carl Linnaeus
Macrosiphini